Alaskan ice cream (also known as Alaskan Indian ice cream, Inuit ice cream, Indian ice cream or Native ice cream, and Inuit-Yupik varieties of which are known as akutaq or akutuq) is a dessert made by Alaskan Athabaskans and other Alaska Natives. It is traditionally made of whipped fat or tallow (e.g. caribou, moose, or walrus tallow, or seal oil) and meat (such as dried fish, especially pike, sheefish or inconnu, whitefish or cisco, or freshwater whitefishes, or dried moose or caribou) mixed with berries (especially cowberry, bilberry, Vaccinium oxycoccos or other cranberries, bearberry, crowberry, salmonberry, cloudberry or low-bush salmonberry, raspberry, blueberry, or prickly rose) or mild sweeteners such as roots of Indian potato or wild carrot, mixed and whipped with a whisk. It may also include tundra greens. There is also a kind of akutaq which is called snow akutaq. The most common recipes for Indian ice cream consist of dried and pulverized moose or caribou tenderloin that is blended with moose fat (traditionally in a birch bark container) until the mixture is light and fluffy. It may be eaten unfrozen or frozen, and in the latter case it somewhat resembles commercial ice cream.

It is not to be confused with Canadian Indian ice cream (or sxusem) of First Nations in British Columbia, nor with kulfi (Indian ice cream) from the Indian Subcontinent.

"Ice cream songs" used to be sung during the preparation of Alaskan Athabascan Indian ice cream.

Recent additions include sugar, milk, and vegetable shortening.

Native names

See also

 List of desserts
 Pemmican
 Tolkusha

References

Native American cuisine
Alaskan cuisine
Alaskan Athabaskans
Inuit cuisine
Yupik culture
Chukchi cuisine
Canadian cuisine
American desserts
American seafood dishes
Wild game dishes